Bastam (also Romanized as Basţām) is a village in Bastam Rural District, in the Central District of Chaypareh County, West Azerbaijan Province, Iran. At the 2006 census, its population was 681, in 155 families. Headed by Wolfram Kleiss, the German Archaeological Institute excavated a Urartean site dating to the 7th cent. BC at Bastam in 1972-1975 and 1977–1978.

References 

Populated places in Chaypareh County